The R527 is a Regional Route in South Africa.

Route
Starting from the R36 just north of Abel Erasmus Pass between the towns of Ofcolaco and Ohrigstad, it heads east. The R531 branches off from it, heading south-east. It ends at an intersection with the R40 at Hoedspruit.

References

Regional Routes in Limpopo